Suur-Espoonlahti (Finnish) or Stor-Esboviken (Swedish) is a south-western main district of Espoo, a city in Finland.

It contains the districts Espoonlahti, Kaitaa, Latokaski, Nöykkiö, Saunalahti, Soukka and Suvisaaristo.

It is one of the fastest-growing districts in Espoo with Suur-Leppävaara.

See also 
 Districts of Espoo

Districts of Espoo